Saigon University (SGU) is a public university located in Ho Chi Minh City, Vietnam. The university offers over 30 degree programs through its academic faculties in 3 campuses, including law, business administration, information technology, applied mathematics, environmental science, biotechnology, electrical engineering, psychology, international studies, English language studies, Vietnam studies, library science and pedagogical subjects.

History

Saigon University was established on 25 April 2007 upon Government Decision No. 478/QĐ-TTTg by Vietnamese Prime Minister Nguyễn Tấn Dũng, operating under the People's Committee in Ho Chi Minh City. It was founded on the basis of the Ho Chi Minh City College of Pedagogy. 
The first enrollments for this university started in July 2007.

Campus

The headquarters of Saigon University is in Ho Chi Minh City, with an official address of 273 An Duong Vuong in District 5.

Other campuses are located at:
 04 Ton Duc Thang, District 1
 105 Ba Huyen Thanh Quan, Ward 7, District 3
 Saigon University Practice Primary School - 20 Ngo Thoi Nhiem, Ward 7, District 3
 Saigon Practice High School - 220 Tran Binh Trong, Ward 4, District 5

A new campus is currently under development in the new urban area in Southern Ho Chi Minh City.

Academics
The structure of each "faculty" at SGU is comparable to those of "colleges" in the United States institutions, where each faculty is composed of two or more departments.

Pedagogy-related faculties
Natural Sciences Pedagogy
Physics
Chemistry
Biology
Mathematics and Applications
Applied Mathematics
Math
Social Sciences Pedagogy
Vietnam Literature
History
Geography
Elementary Pedagogy
Childhood Education
Kindergarten Pedagogy
Early Childhood Education
Fine Arts
Pedagogical Fine Arts
Performing Arts
Pedagogical Performing Arts
Education Administration
Psychology
Education Administration

Other faculties
Culture & Tourism
Vietnam Studies (Culture & Tourism)
International Studies
Tourism
Foreign Language
English Language Studies
Pedagogical English
Information Technology
Business Administration
Library and Information Science
Library Science
Office Administration
Archival Science
Executive Secretary
Finance and Accounting
Environmental Science
Political Studies
Law
Engineering
Industrial Engineering
Agricultural Engineering
Family Economics
Electronics and Telecommunication Engineering

Academic research centers
 Information Technology Center
 Key learning Facilities Center
 Foreign Language Center
 Information - Communications & Education Development Center
 Environment and Natural resources
 Student Assistance Center
 International Training Center

Partner universities
  IMC University of Applied Sciences Krems

External links
Saigon University

Universities in Ho Chi Minh City